The village weaver  (Ploceus cucullatus), also known as the spotted-backed weaver or black-headed weaver (the latter leading to easy confusion with P. melanocephalus), is a species of bird in the family Ploceidae found in much of sub-Saharan Africa. It has also been introduced to Portugal and Venezuela as well as to the islands of Hispaniola, Martinique, Puerto Rico, Mauritius and Réunion.

This often abundant species occurs in a wide range of open or semi-open habitats, including woodlands and human habitation, and frequently forms large noisy colonies in towns, villages and hotel grounds. This weaver builds a large coarsely woven nest made of grass and leaf strips with a downward facing entrance which is suspended from a branch in a tree. Two to three eggs are laid. Village weavers are colonial breeders, so many nests may hang from one tree.

Village weavers feed principally on seeds and grain, and can be a crop pest, but it will readily take insects, especially when feeding young, which partially redresses the damage to agriculture. The calls of this bird include harsh buzzes and chattering.

Taxonomy and systematics 
Philipp Ludwig Statius Müller provided the first scientific name, Oriolus cucullatus, in his 1776 translation in German of the famous Systema Naturae, written by Carl Linnaeus. The classification provided by Statius Muller was based on a description by Buffon, who in turn made use of work by Mathurin Jacques Brisson. Brisson was the first to publish a black-and-white etching of the bird in 1760. The first colored figure was made by François-Nicolas Martinet in a book titled Planches enluminées d'histoire naturelle by Edme-Louis Daubenton, that was published in 1783. The specimen described by Brisson was collected in Senegal by Michel Adanson between 1748 and 1754, and who sent it to René Antoine Ferchault de Réaumur in France. Latham eventually gave the scientific name Oriolus textor in 1790. Based on Oriolus textor, Johann Friedrich Gmelin erected in 1825 a new genus he named Textor. This name has priority over the use of the genus name in the combination Textor alecto that Temminck described in 1828, and which is a synonym for the first name of the white-billed buffalo-weaver, Coccothraustes albirostris, as named by Vieillot in 1817, and now assigned to the genus Bubalornis. The species epithet cucullatus is Latin and means "hooded".

In 1789, Johann Friedrich Gmelin distinguished Loxia abyssinica, which was later recognised as a subspecies of the village weaver and for which the new combination P. c. abyssinicus was created. Louis Jean Pierre Vieillot described a slightly different bird that he called subspecies collaris in 1819. Nicholas Aylward Vigors in 1831 distinguished subspecies spilonotus.

Etymology
The first English name, "weever oriole" was given by John Latham, an early British ornithologist, whose work was often cited by Linnaeus. "Village weaver" has been designated the official name by the International Ornithological Committee (IOC).  Other English names are "black-headed weaver", "Layard's black-headed weaver", "black-hooded weaver", "mottled-backed weaver", "mottled weaver", "spotted-backed weaver", "spot-backed weaver", and "V-marked weaver". Statius Muller gave it the German name Rappendrossel, and Brisson named the bird Le Pincon du Senegal in French and Fringilla senegalensis in Latin, both meaning "Senegal finch".  In southern Africa, the bird is known as jesa in Shona, lihlokohloko in Siswati, letholopje in Sesotho, kwera nguya in Kiswahili, thaga in Setswana, ndzheyana in Tsonga, ihobo-hobo in Xhosa and ihlokohloko in the Zulu language. In West Africa, some common names are ɛ̀gà in Yoruba, àxà in Edo, àʃá in Igbo, ègwa in Nupe, and àga in Idoma.

Subspecies
Eight subspecies are recognized:

 Ploceus cucullatus cucullatus – (Müller, 1776): The nominate subspecies occurs from Mauritania, Senegal and Gambia to southern Chad and Cameroon. It also can be found on Bioko. This nominate subspecies was introduced to Hispaniola.
 Ploceus cucullatus abyssinicus – (Gmelin, JF, 1789): Found in northern Sudan, Eritrea and Ethiopia.
 Ploceus cucullatus bohndorffi – Reichenow, 1887: Found in southern Sudan, northern Democratic Republic of Congo, Uganda, western Kenya and north-western Tanzania.
 Ploceus cucullatus frobenii – Reichenow, 1923: Found in southern and south-eastern Democratic Republic of Congo.
 Mottled weaver (Ploceus cucullatus collaris) – Vieillot, 1819: Found in Gabon, western Democratic Republic of Congo and Angola.
 Ploceus cucullatus graueri – Hartert, 1911: Found in eastern Democratic Republic of Congo, Rwanda and western Tanzania.
 Layard's weaver (Ploceus cucullatus nigriceps) – (Layard, EL, 1867): Found from southern Somalia and eastern Kenya through eastern and southern Tanzania to south-eastern Democratic Republic of Congo, southern Angola and north-eastern Namibia, western Zimbabwe, eastern Zambia and central Mozambique. It also occurs on São Tomé where it was probably introduced.
 Spotted-backed weaver (Ploceus cucullatus spilonotus) – Vigors, 1831:, Found in south-eastern Botswana, eastern South Africa and southern Mozambique. This subspecies was introduced to Mauritius, Réunion and Venezuela.

Description
The village weaver is a stocky 15–17 cm bird with a strong conical bill and dark reddish eyes. In the northern part of its range, the breeding male has a black head edged by chestnut (typically most distinct on the nape and chest). Towards the southern part of its range, the amount of black and chestnut diminish, and the breeding males of the southernmost subspecies only have a black face and throat, while the nape and crown are yellow. In all subspecies the breeding male has a black bill, black and yellow upperparts and wings, and yellow underparts.

The non-breeding male has a yellow head with an olive crown, grey upperparts and whitish underparts. The wings remain yellow and black. The adult female has streaked olive upperparts, yellow and black wings, and pale yellow underparts. Young birds are like the female but browner on the back.

Distribution and habitat
The village weaver is among the more common weaver species, and is widespread in Sub-Saharan Africa, but is absent from the arid regions in the southwest and northeast. It has been introduced to islands in the Indian Ocean and the Caribbean, where it has adapted well to the climate similar to its original range.

Behavior and ecology
Village weavers forage and roost in large groups, often with other weaver species. In some areas, they move periodically along fixed routes. The birds look for food on the ground, but also look up to search vegetation and trees. The village weaver nests in colonies and is very active during the breeding season. Birds fly in and leave again constantly, making a lot of noise. Colonies can contain as many as 150 nests, but anything between eight and a hundred nests in a single tree is usual.

The male weaves the structure of the nest using long strips of leaf, that he has torn from palms or large grass species such as Arundo donax. The nest is roofed, ovoid or kidney-shaped, internally consisting of a nesting chamber that is separated by a ground sill from an antechamber, that has the entrance of the entire nest at the bottom. On the inside, the ceiling is made of strips of grass or other leaves, which are simply inserted instead of woven-in. The floor on the inside is lined by short, thatched strips of palm, grass blades or heads, and feathers. The nest requires about three hundred long strips of leaf, which the male tears off and transports one by one. The male gathers building material throughout the building process, during which he works with his feet in exactly the same position, and maintaining the same orientation. He starts by creating the attachment by weaving around mostly two hanging branches just below a fork, a foot on both of them, which he includes in a ring he constructs by weaving in the plain of the branches at the edge of his reach. He than extends the high end of the ring in front of its head, gradually working towards his feet creating a half-globe, that is the nesting chamber. The male continues by constructing the roof of the antechamber, working over his head. This is followed by lining the ceiling, and constructing the entrance tube, hanging upside-down, but still with his feet at the same spots. The weaving technique consists of seizing a strip of near the end and double the strip back on itself. Next he pokes the end with a vibrating movement in between his previous work until it sticks. He then release it, moves his head to the other side of the nest wall, seizes the strip again and pokes it in somewhere. He keeps repeating this, regularly reversing the direction in which he weaves the strip, poking and pulling the strip through holes until the entire length is used. The female collects material too, but she occupies herself only with the lining of the nesting cup.

Gallery

References

External links
 
 Village weaver species page on Weaver Watch
 (Village weaver = ) Spotted-backed weaver – Species text in The Atlas of Southern African Birds.

village weaver
Birds of Sub-Saharan Africa
Birds of the Dominican Republic
village weaver
village weaver